Ken Weaver may refer to: 

 Ken Weaver (Ackley Bridge), fictional character
 Ken Weaver (musician) (born 1940), American singer, songwriter and musician
 Ken Weaver (racing driver) (born 1956), American racing driver

See also
 Ken Weafer (1913–2005), American baseball pitcher